The Allegory of Hearing is the fourth studio album by Roy Montgomery, released on 29 August 2000 by Drunken Fish Records. The album artwork features a section of The Five Senses by Jan Brueghel the Elder and Peter Paul Rubens.

Track listing

Personnel 
Adapted from The Allegory of Hearing liner notes.
Roy Montgomery – guitar, organ, mixing
Production and additional personnel
Jan Breughel I – illustrations
Arnold Van Bussell – engineering
John Hill – illustrations
Susanne Hill  – illustrations

Release history

References

External links 
 The Allegory of Hearing at Discogs (list of releases)

2000 albums
Roy Montgomery albums
Drunken Fish Records albums